Morning gown may refer to:
 Morning dress
 Dressing gown